The Wurtland Union Church and Meeting House is a historic church at 325 Wurtland Avenue in Wurtland, Kentucky. It was built in 1921 and added to the National Register of Historic Places in 2008 as Wurtland Union Church.

The church was disassembled in 2009 and was in process of restoration in 2012.

References

Churches on the National Register of Historic Places in Kentucky
National Register of Historic Places in Greenup County, Kentucky
1921 establishments in Kentucky
Churches completed in 1921